Michael Siegfried Raphael (born November 7, 1951) is an American harmonica player, music producer and actor best known for his work with Willie Nelson, with whom he has toured as part of The Family since 1973. 

He has performed or recorded with Jason Isbell, Townes Van Zandt, Chris Stapleton, Jerry Jeff Walker, Tom Morello, Paul Simon, Snoop Dogg, Engelbert Humperdinck, Nitty Gritty Dirt Band, Leon Bridges, Neil Young, Norah Jones, Bob Dylan, Ray Charles, Duane Eddy, Vince Gill, Emmylou Harris, Leon Russell, Lionel Richie, Elton John, Mötley Crüe, Zac Brown Band, Dave Matthews, Blue Öyster Cult, Wynton Marsalis, Lonnie Donnegan, Kenny Chesney, Toby Keith, U2, Johnny Cash, Merle Haggard, Kris Kristofferson, Don Williams, Jerry Lee Lewis, Blind Boys of Alabama, Waylon Jennings, Aaron Lewis, Margo Price, Rodney Crowell, Gov't Mule, Supersuckers and Dan Auerbach.

Production credits include Naked Willie, a stripped-down remix of Willie Nelson's early RCA catalogs and the 2016 release of The Highwaymen box set, which includes live performances by Willie Nelson, Waylon Jennings, Johnny Cash and Kris Kristofferson, and one new release co-produced by Raphael with Chips Moman.

Raphael also appeared in the movies Songwriter and Honeysuckle Rose, and filmed performances with Willie Nelson, Wynton Marsalis, and Norah Jones.

Mickey Raphael lives in Nashville and continues to tour, record, and produce projects in Nashville, New York, and Los Angeles.

Selective discography 
Mickey Raphael appears on the following albums:

 Elite Hotel - Emmylou Harris (1975)
 Luxury Liner - Emmylou Harris (1976)
 Two the Hard Way - Cher, Gregg Allman (1977)
 Quarter Moon in a Ten Cent Town - Emmylou Harris (1978)
 Ain't Living Long Like This - Rodney Crowell (1978)
 TNT - Tanya Tucker (1978)
 Right or Wrong - Rosanne Cash (1980)
 The Fox - Elton John (1981)
 Evangeline - Emmylou Harris (1981)
 Seven Year Ache - Rosanne Cash (1981)
 Cimarron - Emmylou Harris (1981)
 White Shoes - Emmylou Harris (1983)
 The Missing Years - John Prine (1991)
 Soft Talk - Shelby Lynne (1991)
 Time for Mercy - Jann Arden (1993)
 Flyer - Nanci Griffith (1994)
 The Tattooed Heart - Aaron Neville (1995)
 Little Acts of Treason - Carlene Carter (1995)
 Deuces Wild - B.B. King (1997)
 Let's Make Sure We Kiss Goodbye - Vince Gill (2000)
 Ringo Rama - Ringo Starr (2003)
 Nashville - Solomon Burke (2006)
 Just Who I Am: Poets & Pirates - Kenny Chesney (2007)
 I'm American - Billy Ray Cyrus (2011)
 Mission Bell - Amos Lee (2011)
 Welcome to the Fishbowl - Kenny Chesney (2012)
 Life on a Rock - Kenny Chesney (2013)
 Carter Girl - Carlene Carter (2014)
 Sleeping Through the War - All Them Witches (2017)
 Windy City - Alison Krauss (2017)
 Songs for the Saints - Kenny Chesney (2018)
 Threads - Sheryl Crow (2019)
 Mississippi Suitcase - Peter Parcek (2020)

References

External links
Official Website
Mickey Raphael | Biography, Albums, Streaming Links @ AllMusic
Mickey Raphael @ Discogs.com
Mickey Raphael Interview NAMM Oral History Library (2021)

1951 births
20th-century American male actors
20th-century American musicians
21st-century American male actors
21st-century American musicians
American male actors
American harmonica players
Jewish American musicians
Living people
Musicians from Dallas
Musicians from Nashville, Tennessee
21st-century American Jews